CASP8-associated protein 2 is a protein, that in humans is encoded by the CASP8AP2 gene.

Function 

This protein is highly similar to FLASH, a mouse apoptotic protein identified by its interaction with the death-effector domain (DED) of caspase 8. Researches of FLASH protein suggested that this protein may be a component of the death-inducing signaling complex, that includes Fas receptor, Fas-binding adapter FADD, and caspase 8, and plays a regulatory role in Fas-mediated apoptosis.

Interactions 

CASP8AP2 has been shown to interact with TRAF2.

References

Further reading

External links